Sakai Tanaka (born May 7, 1961, male) is a Japanese Freelance journalist.

History
He was born in Tokyo in 1961. He graduated Tohoku University business school, and he was employed by Toray Industries and Kyodo News next. In Kyodo News he was assigned in the foreign news department, and he was charmed with English news story. He was invited to Microsoft Corp. which was groping for substantial contents, and he was engaged in the distribution business of news. Then he became independent.

International news explanation
He delivers Japanese, Chinese, and Korean news.

See also
Kyodo News
Microsoft
Neoconservatism

References

External links
Sakai Tanaka's International news explanation (Japanese)
Sakai Tanaka's International news explanation (Chinese)
Sakai Tanaka's Gando News (Korean)

1961 births
Living people
Japanese journalists
Tohoku University alumni